The St. Louis Film Critics Association (SLFCA) is an organization of film critics operating in Greater St. Louis and adjoining areas of Missouri and Illinois which was founded in 2004.

In December of every year, the SLFCA assemble to vote on their annual film awards, which includes the SLFCA Award and one Special Recognition Award for a best scene, cinematic technique or other memorable aspect or moment in a film. SLFCA Awards are presented across nineteen categories and are recognized by multiple film critic associations and media outlets, particularly during award season; these awards are often recognized as a means for assessing the best or most celebrated films of the year, as well as front-runners for notable film industry awards, such as the Academy Awards.

Membership requirements and association structure

The St. Louis Film Critics Association outline eight bylaws for the organization and fourteen affiliated media outlets. According to the SLFCA, membership requirements for the association are as follows: "Critics who are Full Members must produce reviews for a media outlet that is recognized by motion picture studios and local film public relations agencies representing the studios. The member's reviews must contain original critical commentary and illustrate a breadth of film knowledge. Reviews that include only plot summaries or information derived from press releases do not qualify.

A critic must watch and review at least 26 current feature-length motion pictures within each calendar year (January 1 - December 31). Qualifying films are those that are: 1) given a wide or limited theatrical release, including those films given concurrent digital multi-platform releases; or 2) screened at a film festival. A qualifying review must be published or broadcast in a timely manner, i.e. within seven days of the film's local opening or screening date. Reviews of theatrically re-released films or home video releases (e.g., DVDs, Blu-rays, or online streaming) do not qualify.

A qualifying standard review must be at least 300 words in length. Two capsule reviews of 100 to 299 words in length may be counted as one standard review. Two audio or video reviews may be counted as one standard review. Written reviews must be professionally edited and formatted, exhibit excellence in grammar and spelling, and accurate with respect to factual information. Reviews that are reprinted or rebroadcast in different formats or outlets, even with minor revisions, are not considered separately.

Qualifying print outlets must have a minimum verifiable circulation of 20,000. Qualifying radio and television outlets must be those that broadcast from an FCC-licensed station (commercial or public) or a satellite / Internet radio station with a wide audience. Qualifying online outlets must be consistently updated, professional in appearance, and have a minimum of 5,000 unique visits per month. Podcasts do not qualify unless the audio reviews are originally broadcast on a qualifying radio or television outlet."

Award categories

 Best Actor
 Best Actress
 Best Animated Film
 Best Art Direction
 Best Cinematography
 Best Comedy
 Best Director
 Best Documentary Feature
 Best Foreign Film
 Most Original, Innovative, or Creative Film
 Best Music/Score
 Best Overlooked Film
 Best Picture
 Best Screenplay
 Best Supporting Actor
 Best Supporting Actress
 Best Visual/Special Effects
 Best Action Film

Award ceremonies
2004
2005
2006
2007
2008
2009
2010
2011
2012
2013
2014
2015
2016
2017
2018
2019
2020
2021
2022

Award breakdown
(2 awards and more)
 9 awards:
 Once Upon a Time in Hollywood (2019): Best Picture, Director, Supporting Actor, Supporting Actress, Original Screenplay, Soundtrack, Production Design, Editing, Special Merit
 7 awards:
 12 Years a Slave (2013): Best Picture, Director, Actor, Supporting Actress, Adapted Screenplay, Cinematography, Scene
 6 awards:
 La La Land (2016): Best Picture, Director, Cinematography, Score, Song, Scene
 5 awards:
 Everything Everywhere All At Once (2022): Best Picture, Actress, Supporting Actor, Original Screenplay, Editing
 The Artist (2011): Best Picture, Director, Music, Screenplay, Supporting Actress
 4 awards:
 The Aviator (2004): Best Picture, Director (Drama), Supporting Actress, Art Direction
 Brokeback Mountain (2005): Best Picture, Director, Screenplay and Actor
 Birdman or (The Unexpected Virtue of Ignorance) (2014): Best Director, Original Screenplay, Cinematography, Score
 The Power of the Dog (2021): Best Director, Supporting Actor, Adapted Screenplay, Cinematography
 3 awards:
 Sideways (2004): Best Comedy/Musical, Screenplay, Director (Comedy/Musical)
 Juno (2007): Best Actress, Screenplay, Comedy
 Mass (2021): Best Original Screenplay, Supporting Actress, Ensemble
 Licorice Pizza (2021): Best Film, Comedy Film, Scene
 2 awards:
 Ray (2004): Best Actor, Score
 The Incredibles (2004): Best Animated Film, Visual Effects
 House of Flying Daggers (2004): Best Cinematography, Art Direction
 The Queen (2006): Best Actress, Screenplay
 The Departed (2006): Best Picture, Director
 The Diving Bell and the Butterfly (2007): Best Foreign Language Film, Most Original/Innovative Film
 No Country for Old Men (2007): Best Picture, Director
 The Dark Knight (2008): Best Supporting Actor, Best Visual/Special Effects
 The Curious Case of Benjamin Button (2008): Best Picture, Most Original/Innovative Film
 Slumdog Millionaire (2008): Best Director, Foreign Language Film
 Up (2009): Best Animated Film, Favorite Scene
 Nine (2009): Best Cinematography, Music
 Up in the Air (2009): Best Picture, Actor
 The Descendants (2011): Best Actor, Screenplay
 The Girl with the Dragon Tattoo (2011): Best Actress, Favorite Scene
 Guardians of the Galaxy (2014): Best Comedy, Soundtrack
 Gone Girl (2014): Best Actress, Adapted Screenplay
 Whiplash (2014): Best Art-House or Festival Film, Supporting Actor
 Cruella (2021): Best Costume Design, Soundtrack
 Dune (2021): Best Score, Visual Effects
 The Banshees of Inisherin (2022): Best Supporting Actress, Original Screenplay
 Elvis (2022): Best Costume Design, Production Design
Women Talking (2022): Best Director, Ensemble

See also
 List of film awards
 St. Louis Gateway Film Critics Association Awards 2018

References

 
American film critics associations
Culture of St. Louis
Mass media in St. Louis
Organizations based in St. Louis